Thomas Capehart House is a historic home located near Kittrell, Vance County, North Carolina.  It was built between 1866 and 1870, and is a small two-story, "L"-shaped frame board-and-batten, dwelling in the Downingesque Gothic style.  It features ornate bargeboards, sawn ornament, and traceried windows.  Also on the property is a contributing small outbuilding, also of board-and-batten.

It was listed on the National Register of Historic Places in 1977.

References

Houses on the National Register of Historic Places in North Carolina
Gothic Revival architecture in North Carolina
Houses completed in 1870
Houses in Vance County, North Carolina
National Register of Historic Places in Vance County, North Carolina